A Letter to Amy is a 1968 children's picture book by American author and illustrator Ezra Jack Keats.

Plot
"Peter [from Keats' The Snowy Day] is having a birthday party, and he's asked all of his friends to come. But Amy is a special friend because she's a girl, so Peter decides to send her a special invitation. When he rushes out in a thunderstorm to mail it, he bumps smack into Amy herself and knocks her to the ground. Will she come to his party now?"

Adaptations
In 1970, Loretta Long narrated the story in a film adaptation from Weston Woods Studios.

References

1968 children's books
American picture books
Books by Ezra Jack Keats
Sequel books
African-Americans in literature